Gina Jeffreys (also known as Gina Jeffries, Gina Hillenberg and Gina McCormack born 1 April 1968) is an Australian country singer-songwriter and radio presenter.

Career
In 1991, Jeffreys competed in The Toyota Star Maker Quest at the Tamworth Country Music Festival. After releasing her first single "Slipping Away" (a cover of the 1975 song by Max Merritt) through BMG Music and "Radio Santa" in 1992, Gina signed a record deal with ABC Music, and released "Two Stars Fell" in 1993. The song went straight to No.1 on the Australian country charts.

"Two Stars Fell" won Jeffreys her first Golden guitar award at the 1994 Tamworth Country Music Awards of Australia for 'Best Female Vocal Award'. Later that year, Jeffreys supported Johnny Cash and Kris Kristofferson on their Australian tours and rave reviews had her the subject of a 'Sixty Minutes' story and she was featured in an 'A Current Affair' segment. Her debut album The Flame was released in August 1994 and went platinum in 1997. Further hits followed including "Girls' Night Out" which won Jeffreys her second Golden Guitar award for 'Best Female Vocal' in 1995.

In July 1996, Gina released her second album, Up Close. This was to be the album that broke the cross-over barrier between country and mainstream. The album debuted straight into the National ARIA Charts at No. 9 while taking up the No. 1 position of the National Country Charts. Up Close achieved Gold status during the same year as its release. Jeffreys toured nationally throughout 1996 and also found time to appear as a guest host of 'Sale of the Century' and co-hosted the 1997 ARIA Music Awards. In 1997, Jeffreys was inducted into Tamworth Hands of Fame.

In June 1998, Jeffreys released her third album Somebody's Daughter which peaked at No. 13 on the ARIA Charts. The album was certified Gold in 1999 and produced the hits song "Dancin' With Elvis" which she won Country Music Television's 'Video of the Year' in 1999. Jeffreys released a Christmas album in 1999, titled Christmas Wish.

Throughout 2000, Jeffreys relocated to Nashville to record her next album, titled Angel. Angel was released in April 2001 and the title track "Angel" won numerous awards; including 2002 Golden Guitar Award - Video Clip of the Year, 2002 APRA Award – Most Performed Country Work and was named a finalist in the Australian Animation Awards in 2001 and charted at No.57 on the ARIA singles chart.

2002 saw the release of Best of Gina Jeffreys... So Far which included her version of Radiohead's Creep which she had performed on Andrew Denton's Musical Challenge. This concluded her contract with ABC Music.

Jeffreys gave birth to her son Jackson in January 2003 and took some time out of the spotlight.

In 2006, Jeffreys signed a deal with 'Ocean Road Music' and returned with the release of her album Walks of Life. In 2007, she was awarded Best Independent Country Release at the Australian Independent Record (AIR) Awards, for her album Walks of Life. At the Tamworth Country Music Festival of 2007, Jeffreys initiated a now annual "Walk of Life" where country music artists and fans walk around the streets of Tamworth to help create awareness and raise money for the Foundation. Money raised goes towards the Leukaemia Foundation.
In April 2007, Jeffreys joined Beccy Cole and Sara Storer to form Songbirds; a successful multi-artist show in Australia that continued for many years. A live DVD was released of the Songbirds in 2009.

In 2009 Jeffreys performed a sell-out concert at Tamworth with Guy Sebastian and Wendy Matthews followed by the release of Old Paint in 2010, a laid-back acoustic album of Gina’s all- time favourites.

In August 2019, Jeffreys released her eighth studio album titled Beautiful Tangle. The first single "Cash" was released in June 2019. It is Jeffrey's first new album in nine years.

From January 2022, Jeffreys replaced Sarah Forster as the co-host of the breakfast show on Star 104.5 on the New South Wales Central Coast, alongside Dave 'Rabbit' Rabbetts.

Discography

Albums

Notes

See also
 Songbirds

Awards and nominations

ARIA Awards
The ARIA Music Awards is an annual awards ceremony that recognises excellence, innovation, and achievement across all genres of Australian music. Jeffreys had been nominated for four ARIA Music Awards

|-
| 1995 || The Flame || Best Country Album ||  
|-
| 1998 || Somebody's Daughter ||Best Country Album ||  
|-
| 2001 || Angel ||Best Country Album ||  
|-
| 2007 || Walks Of Life || Best Country Album ||  
|-

APRA Awards

The APRA Awards are held in Australia and New Zealand by the Australasian Performing Right Association to recognise songwriting skills, sales and airplay performance by its members annually. Jeffreys has won two awards.

|-
| 1998
| "I Haven't Got a Heart"
| Most Performed Country Work
| 
|-
| 2002
| "Angel"
| Most Performed Country Work
| 
|-

Australian Independent Record Label Association Awards
Jeffreys has won one AIR Award

|-
| AIR Awards of 2007 || Walks Of Life || Best Independent Country Release || 
|-

Country Music Awards (CMAA)
The Country Music Awards of Australia (CMAA) (also known as the Golden Guitar Awards) is an annual awards night held in January during the Tamworth Country Music Festival, celebrating recording excellence in the Australian country music industry. They have been held annually since 1973. Jeffreys has won five awards.

 (wins only)
|-
| 1994 || "Two Stars Fell" || Female Vocalist of the Year  || 
|-
| 1995 || "Girls Night Out" || Female Vocalist of the Year  || 
|-
| 1996 || "Didn't we Shine" || Female Vocalist of the Year  || 
|-
| 1999 || "Dancin' With Elvis"  || Female Vocalist of the Year  || 
|-
| 2002 || "Angel" [Gina Jeffreys (directed by Dylan Perry)] || Video Clip of the Year || 
|-
| 2007 || herself || Hands of Fame || 
|-

Mo Awards
The Mo Awards are annual Australian entertainment industry awards. They recognise achievements in live entertainment in Australia. Jeffreys has won four awards.

|-
| 1993 || herself|| Female Country Entertainer of the Year|| 
|-
| 1994 || herself|| Female Country Entertainer of the Year|| 
|-
| 1996 || herself|| Female Country Entertainer of the Year|| 
|-
| 1998 || herself|| Female Country Entertainer of the Year|| 
|-

References

External links
 Gina Jeffreys official web site

1968 births
Living people
APRA Award winners
Australian country singers
Australian women singers
Songbirds (group) members
Musicians from Queensland